Oneness may refer to:

Economy
 Law of one price (LoP), an economic concept which posits that "a good must sell for the same price in all locations".

Religious philosophy
 Oneness Pentecostalism, a movement of nontrinitarian denominations
 Nondualism
 Divine simplicity, a theological doctrine that holds God is without parts
 Henosis, a concept in Greek mysticism denoting "oneness" or "unity"
 Meditative absorption, oneness, Samadhi
 Monism, a metaphysical concept in philosophy
 Monotheism, the belief that only one deity exists
 Tawhid, Islam's fundamental concept that God is one and single
 The three oneness, three core assertions in the Baháʼí teachings#Unity

Art and culture
 OneNess, a poet/singer/entertainer (see Poet in the City)
 Oneness idents, used by BBC One TV station between 2017 and 2022

In music
 Oneness (Carlos Santana album), a 1979 rock album
 GodWeenSatan: The Oneness, the 1990 debut album by American rock band Ween
 Oneness (Jack DeJohnette album), a 1997 jazz album

See also 
Divine unity (disambiguation)